Grevillea longifolia, commonly known as fern-leaf spider flower, is a species of flowering plant in the family Proteaceae and is endemic to the Sydney Basin in New South Wales. It is an erect to spreading shrub with narrowly egg-shaped to almost linear leaves, and toothbrush-like groups of pinkish-fawn flowers with a pink to red style. It is fairly readily grown in gardens.

Description

Taxonomy
Grevillea longifolia was first formally described in 1830 by Robert Brown in his Supplementum primum Prodromi florae Novae Hollandiae, from specimens collected by George Caley near Port Jackson in July 1807. The specific epithet (longifolia) means "long-leaved".

Distribution and habitat
Grevillea longifolia is restricted to the Sydney Basin, particularly the southern areas and Woronora Plateau. It is found in the Heathcote and Royal National Parks, but has vanished from the Burwood and Carlton districts where it once grew. It grows on Hawkesbury Sandstone and yellow clay soils, often along riverbanks and streams. It grows in shaded or part-shaded situations in woodland or forest, under such trees as blue leaved stringybark (Eucalyptus agglomerata), Sydney peppermint (E. piperita), stringybark (E. oblonga), smooth-barked apple (Angophora costata) and red bloodwood (Corymbia gummifera), and shrubs such as gymea lily (Doryanthes excelsa), and near creeks with such shrubs as Lomatia myricoides, watergum Tristania neriifolia, kanooka (Tristaniopsis laurina) and trees 
blackbutt (Eucalyptus pilularis) and coachwood (Ceratopetalum apetalum).

Ecology
This grevillea is killed by fire, but regenerates from seed. The seed are sometimes eaten by insects, or by native mammals such as the bush rat (Rattus fuscipes) and swamp wallaby (Wallabia bicolor).

Use in horticulture
Grevillea longifolia adapts readily to cultivation, and can be propagated vegetatively by cutting as plants have a tendency to hybridise, making seed parentage unclear. It is grown commercially in the south of France for its foliage. It is sometimes sold mistakenly labelled as G. aspleniifolia.

References

Flora of New South Wales
longifolia
Proteales of Australia
Plants described in 1830
Taxa named by Robert Brown (botanist, born 1773)